Prairie Grove is the name of some places in the United States:

Prairie Grove, Arkansas
Prairie Grove, Illinois